Terråk is the administrative centre of the municipality of Bindal in Nordland country, Norway. The village is located in the eastern part of the municipality, along the shore of the Sørfjorden arm of the Bindalsfjorden. The nearby Vassås Bridge connects Terråk to the village of Vassås just to the north.

Terråk is the commercial center for the municipality. Boat building has been historically important in the area, which is why the village hosts the annual Nordland boat regatta.

References

Villages in Nordland
Bindal